Marooned Hearts is a lost 1920 American silent drama film directed by George Archainbaud. It starred Conway Tearle and Zena Keefe.

Plot
As described in a film magazine, Dr. Paul Carrington (Tearle), a young surgeon looked to for great things, becomes engaged to Marion Ainsworth (Keefe), a sincere but selfish daughter of wealth. On a day when they set out boating, her failure to deliver a message to her fiance demanding his immediate return to the hospital brings him to ill favor with his associates. He discovers her deception and, shouldering the disgrace to shield her, goes to a tropical island to conduct his experiments in solitude. A year later she seeks to follow him, but a shipwreck causes her to be cast upon the shore, where he finds her. He divides the island between them and promises to protect her, but orders her not to disturb him and his work. A sailor also cast upon the island attacks her, and Paul comes to her rescue, finally declaring his love for her. With his experiments completed and successful, the three return to civilization and happiness.

Cast
Conway Tearle as Dr. Paul Carrington
Zena Keefe as Marion Ainsworth
Ida Darling as Mrs. Ainsworth
Tom Blake as Peter Harkins
Eric Mayne as Cyrus Carter
George Backus as Dr. Matthews
Joseph Flanagan as Butler
Lavilla Siebert as High Diver

References

External links

Still portrait (archived)

1920 films
American silent feature films
Lost American films
Films directed by George Archainbaud
American black-and-white films
Silent American drama films
1920 drama films
Selznick Pictures films
1920 lost films
Lost drama films
1920s American films